The Traverse City Film Festival is an annual film festival held at the end of July in Traverse City, Michigan. The festival was created as an annual event in 2005 to help “save one of America's few indigenous art forms—the cinema". The event was co-founded by Michael Moore, the Oscar-winning film director, well known for his anti-establishment films and documentaries such as Fahrenheit 9/11, Bowling for Columbine, and Roger & Me, along with author Doug Stanton and photographer John Robert Williams. 

The mission of the Festival is to show "Just Great Movies" that represent excellence in filmmaking, particularly those rare independent films and documentaries by both noted and new filmmakers, that do not receive mainstream distribution.

The Traverse City Film Festival is a non-profit organization, and is funded by businesses, community groups and individuals, in addition to ticket sales accumulated by various events. The Festival is headed by a board of directors of filmmakers, writers, and creative professionals. Traverse City Film Festival also showcases all volunteer music, with over 60 regional artists featured in the 2016 event.



Official selections

2005

The 1st annual Traverse City Film Festival was held July 27–31, 2005. The 5-day event featured many independent films, plus four classic films. The independent films were shown in three indoor venues in downtown Traverse City: the State Theatre, the Old Town Playhouse, and the City Opera House. In addition, each night, a classic film was shown on a giant inflatable screen along West Grand Traverse Bay in the city's Open Space Park. Broken Flowers, a winner at the 2005 Cannes Film Festival, was shown at the Traverse City Film Festival before being released to the general public. Other 2005 Traverse City Film Festival selections covered a gamut of film subjects ranging from period romances, unemployment, terrorism, among many other subjects.

11 de Septembre
The Assassination of Richard Nixon
The Ax
Balzac and the Little Chinese Seamstress
The Baxter — Audience Grand Prize
Broken Flowers
Czech Dream — Nonfiction Prize
Downfall — Fiction Prize
The Edukators — Founders' Grand Prize
Enron: The Smartest Guys in the Room — Scariest Film
A Good Woman
Grizzly Man — Founders' Grand Prize
Gunner Palace
Home of the Brave
Italian for Beginners — Preservationist Award
Time Out

Land of Plenty
Les Misérables — Preservationist Award
The Life of Brian — Mike's Surprise
Mad Hot Ballroom
Me and You and Everyone We Know
Mondovino
My Summer of Love
Human Resources
The Talent Given Us — Best First Film
Tarnation — Stanley Kubrick Prize
The Woodsman
Free Movies at the Open Space:
Casablanca
Ferris Bueller's Day Off
Jaws
The Princess Bride

2006
The second annual Traverse City Film Festival was held July 31 – August 6, 2006. Michigan Filmmaker Award went to Jeff Daniels.

a/k/a Tommy Chong
Air Guitar Nation — Audience Prize (Silver)
Amadeus
The Beauty Academy of Kabul
Borat: Cultural Learnings of America for Make Benefit Glorious Nation of Kazakhstan — Excellence in Filmmaking Award
Born on the Fourth of July
Caché
The Canary Effect — Stanley Kubrick Award for Bold and Innovative Filmmaking
The Dying Gaul
Far and Away
Flirting with Disaster
Fresh
Hotel Rwanda
I Want Someone to Eat Cheese With
An Inconvenient Truth
Innocent Voices
Iraq in Fragments
Iron Island
Jesus Camp — Scariest Film Award
John and Jane
Joyeux Noël
Kiss Kiss Bang Bang
L'America
La Moustache
Little Miss Sunshine — Audience Prize (Bronze)
Lost Skeleton of Cadavra
Men at Work — Founders Prize
Nine Lives
O Lucky Malcolm
Paradise Now
Pittsburgh
President Mir Qanbar
The Prize Winner of Defiance, Ohio — 'Splain Award (why this film wasn't brought to Traverse City)
The Promise
The Road to Guantánamo — Founders Prize
Scoop

Soldiers Pay
Some Mother's Son
Son of Man — Founders Prize
The Squid and the Whale
Street Thief — Homeland Security Award
The Three Burials of Melquiades Estrada
Slacker Uprising – Mike's Surprise
This Film Is Not Yet Rated
Three Kings
Tsotsi
The TV Set
Viva Zapatero! — Audience Prize (Gold)
The War Tapes — Best Cinematography
Who Killed the Electric Car? — Roger Smith Award
Winter Passing — Best Use of the Words Traverse City in a Feature Film
Wordplay — Best Action Film
Zathura
Stanley Kubrick Tribute:
2001: A Space Odyssey
Barry Lyndon
A Clockwork Orange
Eyes Wide Shut
Full Metal Jacket
The Killing
Lolita
Paths of Glory
The Shining
Spartacus
Stanley Kubrick: A Life in Pictures
Free Movies at the Open Space:
Dr. Strangelove
Jurassic Park
Monty Python and the Holy Grail
Napoleon Dynamite
Pee-wee's Big Adventure
The Wizard of Oz

2007
The third annual festival was held July 31 – August 5, 2007. Michigan Filmmaker Award went to Christine Lahti.

9 Star Hotel
Al Franken: God Spoke
Arctic Tale
Away from Her
Black Butterfly
Black Sheep
Blame it on Fidel — Special Jury Prize for Narrative Perspective
Blue State
The Bridge on the River Kwai
Chicago 10
Curse of the Golden Flower
Day Night Day Night
Deliver Us from Evil
Dont Look Back
Eleven Men Out
Everything's Cool
The Fever of '57
Fireworks Wednesday
Grace Is Gone
The Graduate
The Host
I Am an American Soldier — Special Founders Prize
In a Lonely Place
In the Shadow of the Moon
The King of Kong
Little Children
The Lives of Others
Maxed Out
Mephisto
Miss Navajo — Special Founders Prize
Molière
My Best Friend

Nashville
Nimrod Nation
No End in Sight — Special Jury Prize/Audience Award Non-Fiction Film
Notes on a Scandal
Once — Founders Prize
Our Daily Bread
Paprika
Paris, je t'aime
Pierrepoint: The Last Hangman
Please Vote for Me — Founders Prize
Rocket Science — Best Fiction Film
Sherrybaby
Sicko Deleted Scenes — Mike's Surprise
The Situation — Stanley Kubrick Prize for Bold and Innovative Filmmaking
Slaughterhouse-Five
A Slim Peace
Talk to Me — Special Jury Prize for Outstanding Writing/Audience Award Fiction Film
Taxi to the Dark Side
The Ten
Trainwreck: My Life as an Idiot — Special Founders Prize
Tuya's Marriage — Special Jury Prize for Visual Impact/Kodak Cinematography Prize
The Valet
Waitress
War/Dance — Best Non-Fiction Film
West Bank Story

Free Movies at the Open Space:
E.T. the Extra-Terrestrial
Grease
North by Northwest
Raiders of the Lost Ark

2008
The fourth annual festival took place July 29 – August 3, 2008. There was a special appearance by Madonna, on August 2, 2008, in order to introduce her film I Am Because We Are. Michigan Filmmaker Award went to Kurt Luedtke. Also this year was the world premiere for Religulous.

Absurdistan
Anvil! The Story of Anvil
Baghdad High
Bigger, Stronger, Faster — Special Jury Prize for Amazing Non-Fiction Film Construction
Blow-Up
Body of War — Best Documentary/Audience Award Best Non-Fiction Film
Buddha Collapsed Out of Shame — Founders Prize
Captain Abu Raed — Audience Award Best Fiction Film/Best of Fest Fiction Film
CSNY/Déjà Vu
The Deal
Dinner with the President: A Nation's Journey
The Diving Bell and the Butterfly
Dust
Encounters at the End of the World
Flash of Genius
4 Months, 3 Weeks and 2 Days
Frozen River — Best American Indie Fiction Film
Funny Face
The General
Gonzo: The Life and Work of Dr. Hunter S. Thompson
Goodbye Bafana
The Grocer's Son — Best Foreign Indie Fiction Film
Hamlet 2 — Firefighters Award for Excellence in Humor
Head Wind
Helvetica
I Am Because We Are
Idiocracy
Johnny Got His Gun
Kenny — The Bamboozler Award Funniest Fiction Feature
The Last Winter
A League of Their Own
Let the Right One In
Man in the Chair
Man on Wire
Michael Moore: Live In London — Mike's Surprise
Miss Gulag
Mongol

The Objective
Older Than America
On the Town
Paraiso Travel
Persepolis
The Pope's Toilet — Best Storytelling Fiction Film
Pray the Devil Back to Hell — Best Non-Fiction Film
A President to Remember: In the Company of John F. Kennedy
The Prisoner or: How I Planned to Kill Tony Blair
Profit motive and the whispering wind — Founders Prize
Redacted
Religulous
Sleep Dealer
Song Sung Blue
The Substitute
Sympathy for the Lobster
Tell No One — Film Incentive Award Should Have Been Shot Here
Battle for Terra
Theater of War — Stanley Kubrick Prize for Bold and Innovative Filmmaking
Them
Trouble the Water — Best American Historical Document
Trumbo
Up the Yangtze
Vicky Cristina Barcelona
War, Inc.
War, Love, God, & Madness
When Did You Last See Your Father?
Wild Strawberries
Yonkers Joe
The Youngest Candidate — Best Non-Fiction Film by a New Filmmaker

Free Movies at the Open Space:
Ghostbusters
The Best of Looney Tunes
Singin' in the Rain
Back to the Future
A League of Their Own

2009
The fifth annual festival was held from July 28 – August 2, 2009. There were 123 screenings of films from over 30 countries. Michigan Filmmaker Award went to Rich Brauer.

About Elly
The Answer Man
Azur and Asmar
The Baader Meinhof Complex
Big Fan
Blood in the Face — Mike's Surprise
Bob & Carol & Ted & Alice
Burma VJ
The Chaser
Chomsky & Company
The Cove — Best Documentary, Jury Award
Crude — Special Jury Prize for Environmental Documentary
Dead Snow
Defamation — Stanley Kubrick Award for Bold and Innovative Filmmaking, Documentary
Departures — Best Fiction Film, Audience Award
Earth Days
Eden is West — Founders Prize for Best Foreign Fiction Film
The End of the Line — Best Foreign Documentary, Jury Award
Enemies, A Love Story
Entre nos — Special Jury Prize, First Narrative Feature Film
Everlasting Moments — Special Jury Prize, Human Spirit
Examined Life
Food, Inc. — Best Documentary, Audience Award
Football Under Cover
The Garden
The Girlfriend Experience
The Greatest — Best Fiction Film U.S., Jury Award
Harmony and Me — Stanley Kubrick Award for Bold and Innovative Filmmaking, Fiction Film
Helen + Joy
Herb & Dorothy
Humpday
In the Loop — Founders Prize for Funniest Fiction Film
Julie & Julia
Laila's Birthday
Learning Gravity — Michigan Prize
Lemon Tree
Mary and Max — Best Fiction Film Foreign, Jury Award

A Matter of Life and Death 
A Matter of Size — Firefighter's Award for Best Comedy Film
Metropolis
Mike's Surprise
No Impact Man
O'Horten — Special Jury Prize for Original Storytelling
The Only Good Indian
Outrage
Patrik, Age 1.5
Rachel — Founders Prize for Best Overall Documentary
Registered Sex Offender — Stanley Kubrick Award for Bold and Innovative Filmmaking, Fiction Film
The Rest Is Silence
Revanche
Roger & Me
Rudo y Cursi
Saint MisbehavinSalt of this Sea — Founders Prize for a First Time Filmmaker
Seraphine
Sita Sings the Blues
Soundtrack for a Revolution
Sugar
Sunshine Barry and the Disco Worms
Troubled Water — Opening Night Film
An Unmarried Woman
Valentino: The Last Emperor
Waltz with Bashir
Waterlife
Which Way Home — Special Jury Prize for Human Rights
William Kunstler: Disturbing the Universe — Special Jury Prize for a New Filmmaker
Winnebago Man — Founders Prize for Best Comedy Documentary
Woodstock: The Director's CutFree Movies at the Open Space:Big
Close Encounters of the Third Kind
Hair
The Goonies
Men in Black

2010
The sixth annual festival was held from July 27 – August 1, 2010. Michigan Filmmaker Award went to John Hughes.Opening and Closing Night:The Kids Are All Right
Nowhere Boy
The Girl Who Played With FireTCFF 3D:Cane Toads: The Conquest
U2 3DComedy & Drama from Home and Abroad:Apart Together
A Brand New Life
Castaway on the Moon — Best Original Vision, Fiction Jury Award
Cherry
Cherry Blossoms
The Concert — Best Fiction Film, Audience Award
Farsan — Fiction Jury Prize for Breakthrough Performance (Jan Fares)
The French Kissers
The Happy Poet — Fiction Jury Prize for Emerging Talent (Paul Gordon)
Heartbreaker
In the Beginning — Best Film, Fiction Jury Award
The Infidel
Lebanon, PA — Founders Prize, Fiction Award
Legacy
The Man Next Door
Me and Orson Welles
Mid-August Lunch — Best Debut Feature, Fiction Jury Award
Please Give
The Secret in Their Eyes
Solitary Man
Tiny Furniture — Fiction Jury Prize for Emerging Talent (Lena Dunham)
The Trotsky
Welcome
When We Leave
Will You Marry Us? — Top Founders PrizeThe Beatles at the Movies (A 40th Anniversary):A Hard Day's Night
Help!
Nowhere BoyA Salute to Cuban Film:Dreaming in Blue
Horn of Plenty
Strawberry and Chocolate
Viva CubaShorts Programs:Short Documentaries
Shorts by Jon Alpert
Shorts by Rory Kennedy
Shorts by U of M Students
Short Fiction 1
Short Fiction 2
Shorts for MidnightDangerous Docs:8: The Mormon Proposition
11/4/08
12th & Delaware
American Radical: The Trials of Norman Finkelstein
Auto*Mate
Budrus — Stanley Kubrick Award for Bold and Innovative Filmmaking
Cleanflix
Collapse
Czech Peace
Draquila – Italy Trembles
The Elephant in the Living Room — Founders Prize, Nonfiction Award
GasLand — Best Environmental Film, Nonfiction Jury Award
Google Baby
Harlan – In the Shadow of Jew Süss
His & Hers (2009 film) — Best Nonfiction Foreign, Jury Award
How to Fold a Flag — Best Nonfiction U.S., Jury Award
Iranian Cookbook
The Miscreants of Taliwood — Best Film, Nonfiction Jury Award
The Most Dangerous Man in America: Daniel Ellsberg and the Pentagon Papers — Best Nonfiction Film, Audience Award
The Oath
Restrepo
Rush: Beyond the Lighted Stage
Smile 'Til It Hurts — Special Jury Prize, Nonfiction Jury Award
South of the Border
Teenage Paparazzo
The Tillman Story — Founders Prize, Nonfiction Award
Waiting for "Superman" — Best Human Rights Film, Nonfiction Jury AwardMidnight:Clash
Tucker & Dale vs Evil
ZonadSpecial Screenings:This Divided State - Mike's Surprise
Dodsworth: Jeff Garlin's Gems
Reel Injun Spirit Award, Nonfiction Jury Award/Special Founders Prize
The Last Command (with the Alloy Orchestra)Kids Fest:The Secret of Kells
Kirikou and the Sorceress
Oblivion Island
Eleanor's SecretFree Movies at the Open Space:Twister
Finding Nemo
Help!
Raising Arizona
Indiana Jones and the Last Crusade
Mary Poppins

2011
The seventh annual festival was held from July 26–31, 2011. There were films at the festival this year from every continent except Antarctica. This was also the first year of Kids Fest on the lawn outside of the newly renovated Lars Hockstad auditorium. Michigan Filmmaker Award went to Sue Marx.Opening and Closing Night:Even the Rain
Made in Dagenham
Modern TimesUS Indies:All Good Things
Everything Must Go — Best Screenplay in a US Narrative Film, Jury
Hesher — Best US Narrative Film, Jury
Higher Ground
Rabbit Hole
Rid of Me — Founders Prize for Best US Fiction FilmNew Foreign Cinema:Black Butterflies
Bride Flight
Face to Face — Founders Prize for Best World Fiction Film
Four Lions — Best World Narrative Screenplay, Jury
The Guard
In a Better World — Audience Award for Best Fiction Film
Incendies — Best World Narrative Film, Jury
Largo Winch
Miral
My Piece of the Pie
The Princess of Montpensier
Queen to Play — Founders Prize for Best World Fiction Film
Romantics Anonymous — Founders Prize for Best of Fest
The Trip
Trophy Wife
The Women on the 6th Floor — Founders Prize for Best World Fiction Film
Young Goethe in LoveState Theatre Centennial Celebration:L'Inferno
Wild & Weird: Alloy Orchestra's Favorite Short Silent Films50th Anniversary of To Kill a Mockingbird:Hey, Boo: Harper Lee
To Kill a MockingbirdUnion! Our Salute to Public Employees:Brothers on the Line
With Babies and Banners: Story of the Women's Emergency Brigade100th Birthday Celebration of Roy Rogers:Don't Fence Me In
Under Western Stars — Founders Prize for Best Classic FilmTribute to Jafar Panahi:The White BalloonLost Gems:The Front
One, Two, ThreeSpecial Screenings:The Blob
Habanastation — Founders Prize for Best of Fest
Here Comes Trouble Book Reading — Mike's Surprise
Two SpiritsKids Fest:A Cat in Paris
Kooky
Mia and the Migoo
Shorts for Kids
TwigsonDangerous Docs:Battle for Brooklyn
Being Elmo: A Puppeteer's Journey — Audience Award for Best Documentary
Bill Cunningham New York
Cave of Forgotten Dreams
Conan O'Brien Can't Stop
An Encounter with Simone Weil — Special Founders Prize
Exporting Raymond
Fordson: Faith, Fasting, Football — Best US Documentary, Jury
Give Up Tomorrow — Best Activism in a World Documentary, Jury
Gnarr — Founders Prize for Best World Documentary Film/Best Direction in a World Documentary, Jury
Granito: How to Nail a Dictator — Founders Prize for Best World Documentary Film
Hot Coffee
How to Start Your Own Country
If a Tree Falls: A Story of the Earth Liberation Front — Founders Prize for Best US Documentary Film
Kumaré
L'amour fou
The Loving Story
Nuremberg: Its Lesson for Today: The Schulberg/Waletzky Restoration
PressPausePlay
Project Nim — Best World Documentary, Jury
Semper Fi: Always Faithful — Special Founders Prize
Shut Up, Little Man! An Audio Misadventure
The Swell Season
When the Drum Is Beating
Where Soldiers Come From — Founders Prize for Best US Documentary Film
Windfall
You've Been TrumpedExperimental Film:Antoine
Traces of a Diary
Vapor Trail (Clark)
Visionaries
The White MeadowsMidnight:Bellflower
Deadheads — Founders Prize for Best Horror Film
Rabies
Shorts for Midnight
TrollhunterKids Fest:A Cat in Paris
Kooky
Mia and the Migoo
Shorts for Kids
TwigsonShorts Programs:Short Animation
Short Documentaries
Shorts by Students
Shorts by U of M Students
Shorts for Adults I
Shorts for Adults II
Shorts for Kids
Shorts for MidnightFree Movies at the Open Space:The Dark Knight — People's Choice Winner
Mr. Deeds Goes to Town
Mrs. Doubtfire
The Empire Strikes Back
Tangled

2012
The eighth annual festival was held from July 31 - August 5, 2012. Michigan Filmmaker Award went to Winsor McCay.Opening & Closing Night and Centerpiece Screenings:Beasts of the Southern Wild
 Searching for Sugar Man
 The Zen of BennettHollywood Sneak Previews: The Campaign
 Hit & RunFriends Only Screenings: BURN
 The IntouchablesSusan Sarandon Tribute: Robot and Frank
 The Rocky Horror Picture Show
 Thelma & LouiseWim Wenders Tribute: Buena Vista Social Club
 Wings of Desire
 Shorts - Wim WendersState Theatre Centennial Celebration: Blackmail
 Richard III
 A Trip to the Moon with The Extraordinary Voyage
 The Story of Film: An Odyssey — Stanley Kubrick Award for Bold and Innovative FilmmakingOccupy the Cinema!: Ashes of America
 Poor America
 The Reluctant Revolutionary
 Shorts - Occupy Wall Street
 Tahrir: Liberation Square
 We Are Legion: The Story of the Hacktivists
 We Are WisconsinWomen: Films from the Early Women's Health Movement
 Growing Up FemaleUS Indies: Bernie
 A Better Life
 Compliance
 First Winter
 The Giant Mechanical Man
 Liberal Arts
 Margaret Special Founders Prize
 Love, Sex and Missed Connections (Missed Connections) — Special Jury Prize – First Time Director
 On the Ice
 Red Flag
 Somebody Up There Likes Me
 Supporting Characters
 Take ShelterNew Foreign Cinema: Coriolanus
 Detective Dee and the Mystery of the Phantom Flame
 Freedom
 Graceland
 Headhunters
 Hysteria
 The Kid with a Bike
 London River
 Monsieur Lazhar
 Nova Zembla
 Oslo, August 31st
 Sleepless Night
 Turn Me On, Dammit!
 Whole Lotta SoleDangerous Docs: 5 Broken Cameras — Founders Prize for Best Picture
 Ai Weiwei: Never Sorry
 Bidder 70 — Founders Prize for Best American Film
 Big Boys Gone Bananas!* — 2nd Runner Up Audience Award Winner
 Code of the West
 Detropia — Special Jury Prize – American Film
 Dinotasia
 Don't Stop Believin': Everyman's Journey — Audience Award Winner
 Ethel — 1st Runner Up Audience Award Winner
 The Flat — Special Jury Prize – Foreign Film
 How to Survive a Plague
 Jiro Dreams of Sushi
 Journey to Planet X
 Louder Than Love: The Grande Ballroom Story
 Payback
 The Queen of Versailles
 The Revisionaries
 Scenes of a Crime
 Sexy Baby — Founders Prize for Best Film by a First Time Director (Jill Bauer and Ronna Gradus)
 Side by Side
 Stuck
 West of Memphis
 The World Before Her — Founders Prize for Best Foreign FilmMidnight: Jackpot
 Let the Bullets Fly
 The Raid: Redemption
 Shorts - Midnight
 V/H/SExperimental Film at Dutmers: Bestiaire
 Indignados
 Into Great Silence
 An Oversimplification of Her BeautySpecial Screenings: The Dictator — Special Screening
 An Afternoon Stroll with Michael Moore — Mike's Surprise
 Up Heartbreak Hill
 The War of the WorldsKids Fest: Circus Dreams
 The Crocodiles
 Legends of Valhalla: ThorShorts Programs: Shorts - AAFF Michael Moore Award Winners
 Shorts - Documentaries 1
 Shorts - Documentaries 2
 Shorts - Fiction 1
 Shorts - Fiction 2
 Shorts - Kids
 Shorts - Midnight
 Shorts - Occupy Wall Street
 Shorts - Spike & Mike's New Generation Festival of Animation
 Shorts - Spike & Mike's Sick and Twisted Festival of Animation
 Shorts - U of M Student Films
 Shorts - Wim Wenders
 Shorts - Winsor McCay, Michigan Filmmaker Award WinnerFree Movies at the Open Space: Footloose — People's Choice Winner
 Rebel Without a Cause
 Star Trek II: The Wrath of Khan
 WALL-E
 When Harry Met Sally...

2013
The ninth annual festival was held from July 30 - August 4, 2013. Paul Feig was honored with the Michigan Filmmaker Award and Michael Apted with the Lifetime Achievement Award. Liana Liberato received the Discovery Award and Mark Cousins, Rob Epstein, and Jeffrey Friedman received the Visionary Award. The Festival added a new venue this year by renovating the former Con Foster Museum into a theater that was named Bijou by the Bay which opened in time for the 2013 Traverse City Film Festival. Opening & Closing Night and Centerpiece Screenings: Austenland
 Blue Jasmine
 Elaine Stritch: Shoot MeDocumentary: The Act of Killing — Stanley Kubrick Award For Bold and Innovative Filmmaking
 A Band Called Death
 Big Easy Express
 Blackfish
 The Central Park Five
 Citizen Koch — Founders Prize Special Award
 Dirty Wars
 Documentary Secret Screening
 The Expedition to the End of the World
 Far from Afghanistan
 The First Movie
 Gideon's Army
 God Loves Uganda
 Good Garbage
 Gore Vidal: The United States of Amnesia — Audience Award Runner Up Best Documentary Film/Founders Prize Special Award
 The Human Scale
 Inequality for All — Audience Award Winner Best Documentary Film
 Mark Cousins Secret Screening
 Mistaken for Strangers — Founders Prize Special Award
 More Than Honey
 Our Nixon — Founders Prize for Best Documentary
 Pandora's Promise
 The Pervert's Guide to Ideology
 Propaganda — Founders Grand Prize for Best Film
 Red Obsession
 Remote Area Medical — Founders Prize for Best Documentary
 Room 237
 Teenage
 Terms and Conditions May Apply
 This Is What Winning Looks Like
 The Trials of Muhammad Ali
 TWA Flight 800
 War on Whistleblowers: Free Press and the National Security StateAmerican: The East — Founders Prize for Best Drama
 The English Teacher
 Erased
 Fruitvale Station — Audience Award Winner Best American Film
 The Girl on the Train
 Killing Them Softly
 Lovelace
 Much Ado About Nothing
 Orenthal: The Musical
 The Pretty One
 Sunlight Jr.
 Trust — Audience Award Runner Up Best American Film
 Trust Me
 We're the MillersState Theatre Centennial Celebration: The Last Days of Pompeii 
 The Phantom of the Opera — with the Alloy OrchestraBefore the Code: Gold Diggers of 1933
 She Done Him WrongMichael Apted Tribute: 56 Up
 Up SeriesTribute to Paul Feig: The HeatForeign: Before Snowfall
 The Broken Circle Breakdown
 Bypass — Founders Prize for Best Comedy
 Dancing Queen
 Dragon
 Fanie Fourie's Lobola
 A Hijacking
 Into the White — Audience Award Runner Up Best Foreign Film
 Kon-Tiki — Founders Prize Special Award
 The Last Days
 No
 A Royal Affair
 Seven Psychopaths
 Starbuck — Audience Award Winner Best Foreign Film
 Superstar
 Süskind
 Wadjda — Roger Ebert Prize for Best Film by a First Time Filmmaker
 Will You Still Love Me Tomorrow?Midnight: Cockneys vs Zombies — John Waters Prize for Best Midnight Film
 The History of Future Folk
 Journey to the West: Conquering the Demons
 The Shining
 UnHung HeroExperimental Film at Dutmers: Suitcase of Love and Shame
 Your Day Is My Night — Buzz Wilson Prize for Best Experimental/Avant Garde FilmSpecial Screenings: Bowling for Columbine — Mike's Surprise
 Doug Loves Movies Podcast
 MaïnaKids Fest: Moon Man
 The Painting — Audience Award Winner Best Kids Film
 Shorts for Kids
 Victor and the Secret of Crocodile MansionFriends Only Screenings: Sole Survivor
 The World is Ours — Founders Prize for Best ComedyTCFF Shorts: The Battle of amfAR
 Short Documentaries 1
 Short Documentaries 2
 Short Narratives
 Shorts by Students
 Shorts by U of M Students
 Shorts for Kids
 Shorts for Midnight
 Waiting for Mamu — Audience Award Winner Best Documentary ShortFree Movies at the Open Space: Across the Universe
 Apollo 13 — People's Choice Winner
 Independence Day
 Pirates of the Caribbean: The Curse of the Black Pearl
 The Princess Bride
 Some Like It Hot

2014
The tenth annual festival was held from July 29 - August 3, 2014. Barbara Kopple was honored this year with the Mid-Life Achievement Award. The Buzz and Movies on a Boat were added as venues.Opening & Closing Night and Centerpiece Screenings: La gran familia española
 Calvary
 Magic in the MoonlightDocumentary: 112 Weddings
 1971'''
 Al Helm: Martin Luther King in Palestine Bending the Light Bronx Obama The Case Against 8 — Audience Award Runner Up Best Documentary Film
 Casting By Dangerous Acts Starring the Unstable Elements of Belarus Dinosaur 13 Don't Leave Me — Founders Prize Special Award
 Fed Up Finding Vivian Maier — Founders Prize Best Documentary
 A Goat for a Vote Happy Valley The Internet's Own Boy: The Story of Aaron Swartz — Founders Prize Special Award
 Ivory Tower Letters to Jackie: Remembering President Kennedy Life Itself — Founders Prize Special Award
 Love and Terror on the Howling Plains of Nowhere Meet the Patels — Audience Award Winner Best Documentary Film & Founders Grand Prize Best Film
 Mission Blue Mitt The Newburgh Sting — Founders Prize Special Award
 The Overnighters Point and Shoot Print the Legend'
 Return to Homs
 Rich Hill — Founders Grand Prize Best Film
 Running from Crazy
 Silenced — Founders Prize Special Award
 Slow Food Story
 Supermensch: The Legend of Shep Gordon
 To Be Takei
 Two Raging Grannies
 The Unknown Known
 Virunga
 Walking Under WaterAmerican: 5 to 7 — Audience Award Winner Best American Film
 Blue Ruin
 Boyhood
 Coherence
 Cold in July
 Fading Gigolo
 Hellion
 Land Ho!
 Life of Crime
 Love is Strange
 The One I Love
 Palo Alto
 Rubber Soul — Founders Prize Special Award
 Sister — Audience Award Runner Up Best American Film
 Summer of Blood
 Wild CanariesState Theatre Centennial Celebration: Lonesome — with the Alloy Orchestra
 On Approval
 Tillie's Punctured RomanceSpecial Screenings: Bag of Rice
 An Evening with Larry Charles
 Mike's Surprise
 Doug Loves Movies Podcast
 LaDonna Harris: Indian 101
 Yesterday and Tomorrow in DetroitKids Fest: Pim & Pom: The Big Adventure
 Thunder and the House of Magic — Audience Award Winner Best Kids FilmFree Movies at the Open Space: Casablanca
 The Goonies
 Jaws
 Jurassic Park
 Star Wars: Episode IV - A New Hope — People's Choice Winner
 The Wizard of OzForeign: The Bachelor Weekend
 Black Coal, Thin Ice
 Blind Dates
 Blue Is the Warmest Colour
 Child's Pose
 Chinese Puzzle
 A Coffee in Berlin
 Excuse My French
 Fishing Without Nets — Roger Ebert Prize for Best Film by a First Time Filmmaker
 A Five Star Life
 The German Doctor
 The Gilded Cage
 The Hunt — Audience Award Runner Up Best Foreign Film
 I Won't Come Back
 The Keeper of Lost Causes
 The Lunchbox
 Manos Sucias
 Manuscripts Don't Burn
 Omar — Founders Prize Best Drama
 One Chance — Audience Award Winner Best Foreign Film
 The Past
 Playing Dead
 Snowpiercer
 Stations of the Cross — Stanley Kubrick Award For Bold and Innovative Filmmaking
 Still Life
 The Volcano — Founders Prize Best ComedyFree Movies at the Buzz: 10%: What Makes a Hero?
 12-12-12
 5 Broken Cameras
 The Broken Circle Breakdown
 Castaway on the Moon
 The Edukators
 Face to Face
 Fishtail
 Good Driver Smetana
 The Hand That Feeds
 Is the Man Who is Tall Happy?
 Keep On Keepin’ On
 La Maison de la Radio
 The Lab
 Men at Work
 Please Vote for Me
 Profit motive and the whispering wind
 Storied Streets
 Troubled Water
 Web Junkie
 West Bank StoryMidnight: The Babadook
 The Canal
 Creep
 
 The Benson Movie Interruption: Road House
 ZombeaversExperimental Film at Dutmers: Focus on Infinity
 The Forgotten Space
 Karpotrotter
 Purgatorio: A Journey Into the Heart of the BorderFriends Only Screenings: Divide in Concord
 Human CapitalTCFF Shorts: Short Documentaries
 Short Experimental Films
 Short Narratives 1
 Short Narratives 2
 Shorts by MSU Students
 Shorts by U of M Students
 Shorts for Kids 1
 Shorts for Kids 2
 Shorts for Midnight
 Shorts from the Ann Arbor Film Festival

 2015 
The eleventh annual festival was held from July 28 - August 2, 2015. Robert Altman received the Visionary Award, Michigan Filmmaker Award went to Roger Corman, and Geraldine Chaplin received the Lifetime Achievement Award. The Woz interactive gallery was a new addition this year.Opening & Closing Night and Centerpiece Screenings: The End of the Tour
 GrandmaDocumentary: 20 Years of Madness
 Amy
 The Armor of Light - Founders Prize Special Award
 Best of Enemies
 The Brainwashing of My Dad
 A Brave Heart: The Lizzie Velasquez Story - Audience Award Winner Best Documentary
 Breaking a Monster
 The Chinese Mayor
 A Courtship
 A Dangerous Game
 Deep Web
 The Diplomat
 Do I Sound Gay?
 National Lampoon: Drunk Stoned Brilliant Dead
 Fear Not the Path of Truth - Changemaker Award
 Finders Keepers - Founders Prize for Best Comedy
 From This Day Forward
 Glen Campbell: I'll Be Me
 Hip Hop-eration
 Holbrook/Twain: An American Odyssey
 Hot Type: 150 Years of the Nation
 The Hunting Ground - Audience Award Runner-Up Best Documentary
 Indian Point
 Life May Be
 Listen to Me Marlon - Founders Prize for Best Film
 Monty Python: The Meaning of Life
 Night Will Fall
 Peace Officer
 Poverty, Inc.
 Prescription Thugs
 Raiders!: The Story of the Greatest Fan Film Ever Made
 Red Army
 Roseanne for President! - Founders Prize Special Award
 The Salt of the Earth
 The State-Mafia Pact
 The Student Body
 (T)ERROR
 T-Rex - Roger Ebert Prize for Best Film by a First Time Filmmaker
 The Trials of Spring - Founders Prize Special Award
 Very Semi-Serious
 The Wanted 18 - Founders Prize for Best Documentary
 We Come as Friends
 The Wolfpack - Founders Prize Special AwardAmerican: 7 Chinese Brothers - Founders Prize Special Award
 Digging for Fire
 Good Kill
 Kill the Messenger - Audience Award Winner Best American Film
 The Last Five Years - Founders Prize Special Award
 Learning to Drive - Audience Award Runner-Up Best American Film
 The Overnight
 Tangerine - Stanley Kubrick Award for Bold and Innovative Filmmaking
 When I Live My Life Over AgainState Theatre Centennial Celebration: Les Vampires
 The Son of the SheikNative American Matinee: Songs My Brothers Taught MeSpecial Screenings: The Benson Movie Interruption: Top Gun
 Doctor Zhivago
 Documentary Now!
 Doug Loves Movies Podcast
 Dusty Stacks of Mom
 Jeff Garlin's Gem: The Old Dark House
 Mike's Surprise
 MSU Presents: (313) Choices
 No More Road Trips?
 Shaun the Sheep
 Yesterday and Tomorrow in Detroit 5Kid's Fest: Fiddlesticks - Stuart J. Hollander Prize for Best Kids Film
 Minuscule: Valley of the Lost Ants —French César Winner for Best Animated FilmForeign: The 100-Year-Old Man Who Climbed Out the Window and Disappeared - Audience Award Runner-Up Best Foreign Film
 Banana
 Cart
 Challat of Tunis - Discovery Award
 Clouds of Sils Maria
 The Connection
 The Crow's Egg
 Dark Places
 Diplomacy
 Force Majeure
 Gett: The Trial of Viviane Amsalem - Founders Prize Special Award
 Güeros
 Haemoo
 Labyrinth of Lies
 Love at First Fight
 Man Up
 Mommy
 Operation Arctic
 Out of Nature
 A Pigeon Sat on a Branch Reflecting on Existence
 Tangerines - Audience Award Winner Best Foreign Film
 Timbuktu
 Two Days, One Night - Founders Prize for Best Drama
 Virgin Mountain
 When Marnie Was There
 Wild Tales - Founders Prize Special AwardMidnight: The Benson Movie Interruption: Speed
 Life of BrianFriends Only Screenings: 99 Homes
 Being CanadianRobert Altman Tribute: Altman
 M*A*S*H
 NashvilleRoger Corman: Corman's Surprise
 Corman's World: Exploits of a Hollywood Rebel
 The Intruder
 The Masque of the Red DeathOrson Welles Centennial: F for Fake
 Touch of EvilAvant Garde: Journey to the West - Buzz Wilson Prize for Best Avant-Garde Film
 Mountain Spirits
 The Owners
 Speculation NationThe Sidebar: City of Gold
 Good Things Await
 King Georges
 Sergio Herman, Fucking PerfectFree Movies at the Open Space: The Birdcage
 The Breakfast Club — People's Choice Winner
 Gravity
 The Great Dictator
 Guardians of the Galaxy
 The Lego MovieTCFF Shorts: The Best Medicine
 Character Study
 Discipline - Founder's Prize Best Narrative Short
 Dusty Stacks of Mom - Founder's Prize Special Mention Short
 Films by Kenneth Anger
 Finding Yourself
 My Enemy, My Brother - Founder's Prize Best Documentary Short
 Off the Grid
 Peace Now
 Shorts by MSU Students
 Shorts by U of M Students
 Shorts for Kids 1
 Shorts for Kids 2
 Shorts from the Ann Arbor Film Festival
 Truth and Consequence
 WTF

 2016 
The twelfth annual Traverse City Film Festival was held from July 26–31, 2016. This year’s festival celebrated the historic State Theatre’s centennial year and honored female filmmakers by featuring films directed by women for every selection in the Official US Documentary and Fiction sections.
 Opening & Closing Night and Centerpiece Screenings: Infinitely Polar Bear
 Tony Robbins: I Am Not Your Guru
 Concerto: A Beethoven JourneyUS Official Selection: Documentary: All this Panic
 Audrie & Daisy
 The Black Panthers: Vanguard of the Revolution
 By Sidney Lumet
 The C Word - Roger Ebert Prize for Best US Documentary Film by a First Time Filmmaker
 Cameraperson - Founders Prize Best US Documentary
 The Champions
 Command and Control
 Death by Design
 Democrats
 Do Not Resist
 Equal Means Equal - Audience Award Winner for Best US Documentary 
 Florence, Arizona
 Generation Startup
 Gleason
 Hooligan Sparrow
 Jeremiah Tower: The Last Magnificent
 The Last Laugh
 Life, Animated
 Men of Sparta
 MSU Presents: Sorta Late
 Norman Lear: Just Another Version of You - Founders Prize Special Award 
 Obit
 Olympic Pride, American Prejudice
 The Pistol Shrimps
 Rosenwald
 Solitary
 Territorio
 Trapped - Founders Prize Special Award 
 Two Trains Runnin’ - Men Make Movies Award 
 Unlocking the Cage - Founders Prize Best US Documentary
 Walk With Me: The Trials of Damon J. Keith
 WeinerUS Official Selection: Narrative The 33
 Certain Women
 The Diary of a Teenage Girl 
 Echo Park 
 Embers
 Equity
 Five Nights in Maine
 Maggie’s Plan - Founders Prize Best US Fiction
 My Blind Brother - Audience Award Winner for Best US Fiction 
 Operator - Roger Ebert Prize for Best US Fiction Film by a First Time Filmmaker 
 Women Who KillForeign Official Selection: Documentary: Censored Voices
 Confusion
 Cooking up a Tribute
 Dark Horse 
 Disturbing the Peace - Founders Prize Best Foreign Documentary, Audience Award Winner for Best Foreign Documentary 
 Eat that Question: Frank Zappa in His Own Words
 Elephant’s Dream
 The Event
 Francofonia
 Heart of a Dog
 Houston, We Have a Problem!
 I Am Belfast - Stanley Kubrick Award for Bold and Innovative Filmmaking
 Ice and the Sky
 Kings of Kallstadt - Roger Ebert Prize for Best US Fiction Film by a First Time Filmmaker
 Lo and Behold, Reveries of the Connected World
 Magnus
 Noma: My Perfect Storm
 Presenting Princess Shaw
 ResetForeign Official Selection: Narrative 3000 Nights
 Adult Life Skill 
 The Brand New Testament
 The Club 
 A Conspiracy Of Faith 
 Dheepan
 El Clasico - Founders Prize Best Foreign Fiction
 The Last Reel - Founders Grand Prize Best Film
 A Man Called Ove - Audience Award Winner for Best Foreign Fiction
 Marguerite
 Mustang
 My Golden Days
 My Internship in Canada
 One Wild Moment
 Parents 
 Sand Storm - Roger Ebert Prize for Best Foreign Fiction Film by a First Time Filmmaker
 Sing Street
 Son of Saul 
 Taxi - Founders Prize Special Award 
 Viva 
 Welcome to Norway 
 Women in Oversized Men’s ShirtsAvant Garde: Elephant’s Dream - Buzz Wilson Prize for Best Avant Garde Film
 The Event
 Heart of a Dog
 Sixty Six
 TerritorioFree Movies at The Open Space: Adam’s Rib
 Frozen
 Jurassic World
 Pitch Perfect
 Shrek - People's Choice Winner
 Wayne’s WorldFriends Only Screenings: Midsummer in Newton 
 Sweet Smell of SpringJuly 28, 2016- A Day in History: The Doug Benson Movie Interruption: Kisses for my President 
 Live  - Hillary Clinton Acceptance SpeechKid's Fest: Phantom Boy
 Oddball - Stuart J. Hollander Prize for Best Kids FilmLost Gems of 2015 Dope
 SuffragetteMen Make Movies- The Struggle Continues Command and Control
 Folk Hero & Funny Guy - Men Make Movies Award
 The Phenom - Men Make Movies Award
 The Pistol Shrimps - Men Make Movies Award
 Tony Robbins: I Am Not Your GuruMichiganders Make Movies: Do Not Resist 
 Generation Startup 
 Men of SpartaMidnight: Here Alone
 The Doug Benson Movie Interruption: A Donald Trump Favorite- Bloodsport
 The Doug Benson Movie Interruption: Kisses For My PresidentPremieres: Gleason 
 Hell or High Water 
 Little Boxes 
 Men of Sparta 
 Sister Cities 
 Walk with Me: The Trials of Damon J. KeithThe Sidebar: Food on Film: Cooking Up A Tribute 
 Jeremiah Tower: The Last Magnificent
 Noma: My Perfect StormState Theatre Centennial Celebration Blow Up
 Chimes at Midnight
 Citizen Kane 
 Civilization 
 Man with a Movie Camera (With the Alloy Orchestra)
 Meet John Doe 
 Who's Afraid of Virginia Woolf?Special Screenings: Doug Loves Movies Podcast
 Native American Manitee: Te Ata
 Where to Invade Next#tween: Dark Horse
 Hunt for the Wilderpeople 
 Ice and the SkyTCFF Shorts: 
 Shorts by MSU Students
 Shorts by U-M Students 
 Shorts: Animated at the Ann Arbor Film Festival 
 Shorts for All Kids 
 Shorts for Kids 4+
 Shorts: Art 
  Best of Fests
  Breaking Curfew
 Fish out of Water 
 Friends Indeed
 It’s Complicated 
 Love & Marriage & Baby Carriage 
 Strange Planet

 2017 
The thirteenth annual Traverse City Film Festival was held from July 25–30, 2017. This year’s festival celebrated works from filmmakers all around the world, especially those from countries targeted by the US travel ban. 19 directors could not attend the festival due to the ban, but Skyped into festival screenings to discuss their work. Mariska Hargitay, Noel Wells, Leonard Maltin, and Gilbert Gottfried were added to TCFF Walk of Fame this year.
 Opening & Closing Night and Centerpiece Screenings: I, Daniel Blake
 Step
 DetroitUS Official Selection: Documentary: 12th and Clairmount
 Abacus: Small Enough to Jail
 Acorn and the firestorm
 Alphago
 Bending the Arc
 Bill Nye: Science Guy 
 The Blood is at the Doorstep
 Chasing Coral
 City of Ghosts
 The Death and Life of Marsha P. Johnson
 Elián
 Flames  
 Frank Serpico
 Gilbert
 I am Evidence
 I Am Not Your Negro
 Icarus
 Long Strange Trip
 Quest
 Rancher, Farmer, Fisherman
 Stranger Fruit
 True Conviction  
 What Lies UpstreamUS Official Selection: Narrative Barry
 Brigsby Bear
 Gook 
 Infinity Baby 
 Landline
 Mr. Roosevelt
 Paris Can Wait
 Patti Cake$ 
 War MachineForeign Official Selection: Documentary: Ada for Mayor
 All Governments Lie: Truth, Deception and the Spirit of I. F. Stone
 Cause of Death: Unknown
 The Chocolate Case 
 Fire at Sea
 Pecking Order
 A River Below
 Rumble: The Indians Who Rocked the WorldForeign Official Selection: Narrative After the Storm
 Afterimage 
 At the End of the Tunnel
 The Distinguished Citizen 
 The Divine Order 
 Drone
 Elle 
 Farewell - Founders Grand Prize Best Film
 Gemma Bovery 
 Graduation
 The Handmaiden
 The Hippopotamus
 Ice Mother
 Julietta
 Junction 48 
 The King's Choice 
 Manifesto
 Mr. Long 
 Neruda  
 Newton 
 The Oath 
 One Week and a Day
 Rock'n Roll
 Things to Come
 Tom of Finland
 Toni Erdmann
 The Trip to Spain
 Truman
 The Wedding Plan
 The Women's Balcony
 The Young Karl MarxAvant Garde: Austerlitz 
 The Challenge
 Inaate/Se/It Shines it a Certain Way. To a certain place./It Flies. Falls./
 Machines
 Stockholm, My LoveFree Movies at The Open Space: La La Land
 Moana
 Snow White and the Seven Dwarfs
 Star Wars: The Force Awakens
 Stop Making Sense 
 Talladega Nights: The Ballad of Ricky Bobby
 What About Bob?Friends Only Screenings: King of Peking 
 The WorkTravel Ban Beats of the Antonov 
 City of Ghosts
 Fishing Without Nets
 Libya in Motion
 A New Day in Old Sana'a
 Nowhere to Hide
 The SalesmanStudent Screenings MSU Presents: Stay With Me 
 CMU Presents: The ClimbKid's Fest: Into the Who Knows!
 Revolting RhymesMidnight: Attack of the Lederhosen Zombies
 Doug Benson Movie Interruption: Starship Troopers
 Raw 
 Vampire Cleanup DepartmentPremieres: Gleason 
 Hell or High Water 
 Little Boxes 
 Men of Sparta 
 Sister Cities 
 Walk with Me: The Trials of Damon J. KeithThe Sidebar: Food on Film: Dinner in Abruzzo/Knife Skills 
 First Growth
 New Chefs on the Block
 Soul
 Wasted! The Story of Food WasteSpecial Screenings: Awake, A Dream from Standing Rock
 Cool Hand Luke
 Doug Loves Movies
 Mike's Surprise
 Reservoir Dogs
 Speedy with the Alloy Orchestra
 To Be or Not to Be#tween: Fanny's Journey
 My Life as a Zucchini 
 The Red Turtle
 Swallows and AmazonsTCFF Shorts: 
 Shorts by MSU Students
 Shorts by U-M Students 
 Shorts for All Kids 
 Shorts for Kids 4+
 Best of Luck With the Wall 
 Commodity City 
 Cop Dog 
 Hot Winter: A Film By Dick Pierre 
 In a Nutshell 
 Iron Hands 
 Moom 
 All the World's A Stage
 Fork in the Road
 Inside Flint 
 Trip Abroad

 2018 
The 14th annual Traverse City Film Festival was held from July 31 - August 5, 2018. Jane Fonda, Dick Cavett, and Leon Vitali were added to TCFF Walk of Fame this year, and Nick Offerman was able to Skype in for the screening of Hearts Beat Loud. Jane Fonda received the Lifetime Achievement Award. The TCFF Student U program was launched this year. 
 Opening & Closing Night and Centerpiece Screenings: RBG
 Burden
 Hearts Beat LoudUS Official Selection: Documentary Ali & Cavett: The Tale of the Tapes
 Arthur Miller: Writer
 Bathtubs Over Broadway
 Bisbee ‘17
 Bombshell: The Hedy Lamarr Story
 The Cold Blue / The Memphis Belle 
 Cracked Up: The Darrell Hammond Story
 Crime + Punishment
 Filmworker
 Freaks and Geeks: The Documentary
 Hal
 Hillbilly
 Hitchcock/Truffaut
 Jane Fonda in Five Acts
 Minding the Gap
 A Murder in Mansfield
 One of Us
 Roll Red Roll
 The Russian Five
 Say Her Name: The Life and Death of Sandra Bland
 The Sentence 
 Stranger Fruit
 Time for Ilhan 
 Water & Power: A California Heist
 White Tide: The Legend of Culebra
 Won't You Be My Neighbor
 WrestleUS Official Selection: Narrative Blaze
 Diane
 Hostiles 
 Leave No Trace 
 The Long Dumb Road
 The Miseducation of Cameron Post
 Nancy
 Never Goin' Back 
 Night Comes On 
 Puzzle 
 Relaxer 
 The Seagull 
 Support The Girls 
 Woman Walks AheadForeign Official Selection: Narrative 1945
 And Breathe Normally 
 The Captain
 The Death of Stalin 
 Disobedience 
 Family Heist
 A Fantastic Woman 
 The Guilty
 How to Talk to Girls at Parties 
 In the Fade
 The Insult
 Let The Sunshine In
 Luba
 Mary Goes Round
 The Other Side of Hope 
 Smuggling Hendrix 
 The Square
 Streaker 
 ZamaForeign Official Selection: Documentary The Eyes of Orson Welles
 Faces Places
 Hitler's Hollywood
 Last Men in Aleppo 
 Loving Vincent
 McQueen
 Our New President
 Perfect Bid: The Contestant Who Knew Too Much
 Pope Francis: A Man of His Word
 Sea Sorrow
 The Silence of OthersFree Movies at The Open Space: Stop Making Sense
 Jumanji: Welcome to the Jungle
 9 to 5
 The Greatest Showman
 Ferris Bueller's Day Off 
 Black Panther
 CocoFriends Only Screenings: Amateurs 
 Skid Row MarathonStudent Screenings MSU Presents: Crandies 
 Shorts by CMU Students 
 Shorts by MSU Students 
 Shorts by U-M StudentsKid's Fest: Jim Button and Luke the Engine Driver
 Maya the Bee: The Honey Games
 Shorts for All Kids
 Shorts for Kids 6+Midnight: Anna and the Apocalypse
 Doug Benson Movie Interruption: Twister
 Ruin Me 
 Shorts AFFood on Film: Back to Burgundy 
 Brewmaster
 Chef Flynn
 The Heat: A Kitchen (R)evolution
 The Quest of Alain DucasseSpecial Screenings: The Atomic Cafe
 Coming Home
 Doug Loves Movies Podcast
 Mike's Surprise
 Julia
 Mino Bimaadiziwin
 Something Wild
 Swimming to Cambodia
 Warrior Women#tween: Supa Modo
 Youth UnstoppableTCFF Shorts Programs: 
 Shorts on Shuffle I
 Shorts on Shuffle II 
 The Future is Shorts 
 Shorts Save America 

 2019 
The 15th annual Traverse City Film Festival was held from July 30 - August 3, 2019. Lily Tomlin received the Lifetime Achievement Award. 
 Opening & Closing Night and Centerpiece Screenings:'''
 Brittany Runs a Marathon (Opening night)
 After the Wedding Blinded by the Light''

Notable filmmakers and guests

Jon Alpert
Michael Apted
Mary Badham
Zal Batmanglij
Kristen Bell
Joe Berlinger
Tom Bernard
Rich Brauer - Michigan Filmmaker Award 2009
Richard Brooks
Jonathan Caouette
Dick Cavett
Geraldine Chaplin - Lifetime Achievement Award 2015
Larry Charles
Bill Couturie
Jeff Daniels - Michigan Filmmaker Award 2006
Carl Deal
Kirby Dick
Phil Donahue
Stanley Donen
Mark Dornford-May
Lena Dunham
Chaz Ebert
Paul Eenhoorn
Ari Emanuel
Rob Epstein
Paul Feig - Michigan Filmmaker Award 2013
JJ Feild
Jane Fonda - Lifetime Achievement Award 2018
Jeffrey Friedman
Jeff Garlin
Terry George
Alex Gibney
Josh Gilbert
Gilbert Gottfried
Wavy Gravy
Sabina Guzzanti
Mani Haghighi
Jan Harlan
Chris Hegedus
Kent Jones
Jake Kasdan
Rory Kennedy

Brian Knappenberger
Barbara Kopple - Mid-Life Achievement Award 2014
Emily Kunstler
Christine Lahti - Michigan Filmmaker Award 2007
David Lascher
Tia Lessin
Victor Levin
Liana Liberato
Thomas Lynch
Malcolm MacDowell
Madonna
Brit Marling
Paul Mazursky
Country Joe McDonald
Matthew Modine
Gretchen Mol
Michael Moore
Tom Morello
Jesse Moss 
Patton Oswalt
D.A. Pennebaker
Bill Plympton
Thom Powers
Rebecca Reynolds
Jay Roach
David O. Russell
Susan Sarandon
Dan Schechter
Yoav Shamir
Charlie Siskel
Ellen Spiro
Ben Steinbauer
Robert Stone
Elaine Stritch
Wes Studi
Michael Stuhlbarg
Rob Tapert
Christopher Trumbo
Leon Vitali
Andrew Wagner
Wim Wenders

Board members

Michael Moore: Founder, President
Tia Lessin: Vice President
Rod Birleson: Secretary
Mark Cousins

Larry Charles
Jeff Daniels
Terry George
Christine Lahti
Tom Morello

Staff
Festival Co-Directors: Susan Fisher and Meg Weichman

References

External links
 

Traverse City, Michigan
Film festivals in Michigan
Tourist attractions in Grand Traverse County, Michigan
Michael Moore